Frank F Truscott (October 2, 1894 – December 1969) was a former Attorney General of Pennsylvania and candidate for Lieutenant Governor of Pennsylvania. He was born to a wealthy horse breeding family and long considered himself to be a gentleman farmer. He graduated with a law degree from Lafayette College in 1917. He was the longtime City Solicitor of Philadelphia and a key fixture in the last days of the city's dying Republican machine; he ran unsuccessfully for Congress in 1940. In 1953, he was appointed to fill a vacancy in the attorney general's office; he did not run for a full term, but instead sought the position of lieutenant governor in 1954. From 1953 to 1969 he was a trustee of his alma mater, Lafayette College.

Truscott was an outspoken opponent of Communism. He was involved in the circulation of a McCarthyist loyalty oath while serving as attorney general. In 1956, he was a prosecutor on the case against communist organizer Steve Nelson.

References

1894 births
1969 deaths
Lafayette College alumni
Pennsylvania Republicans
People from Stroudsburg, Pennsylvania
Lafayette College trustees
20th-century American academics